Tazeh Kand (also Romanized as Tāzeh Kand) is a village in Sain Rural District, in the Central District of Sarab County, East Azerbaijan Province, Iran. At the 2006 census, its population was 48, in 8 families.

References 

Populated places in Sarab County